Władysław Kuncewicz (born 23 October 1888, date of death unknown) was a Polish swimmer. He competed in the men's 100 metre freestyle event at the 1928 Summer Olympics.

References

External links
 

1888 births
Year of death missing
Sportspeople from Kazan
People from Kazansky Uyezd
People from the Russian Empire of Polish descent
Polish male freestyle swimmers
Olympic swimmers of Poland
Swimmers at the 1928 Summer Olympics
Polish people of the Polish–Soviet War